José or Joseph Penso de la Vega, best known as Josseph de la Vega (ca. 1650 — Amsterdam, 13 November, 1692), was a Sephardi Jewish merchant in diamonds, financial expert, moral philosopher and poet, residing in Amsterdam. He became famous for his masterpiece Confusion of Confusions. Vega's work is the first study written about the Amsterdam Stock Exchange and its participants, the shareholders. In a stilted style he describes the whole gamut, running from options (puts and calls), futures contracts, margin buying, to bull and bear conspiracies, even some form of stock-index trading. The publication of  helped lay the foundations for modern fields of technical analysis and behavioral finance.

Biography 

Joseph Penso Felix was born about 1650 into a family of Spanish and Portuguese Jews; it is unknown where. He was the son of Isaac Penso Félix (1608-1683) a merchant, and of Esther de la Vega (-1679). His father was a converso from Espejo, a small town in Córdoba province (Andalusia), who had made a solemn vow in the dungeon of the Inquisition that within a year after regaining his liberty he would openly profess Judaism.  This oath he fulfilled in Middelburg after his escape to Antwerp. He moved to Hamburg, where he married Esther de la Vega; Sara, their first child, was born there in 1645. In 1655 he was appointed parnas, not long after the family settled in Amsterdam.   According to the marriage certificates in the Amsterdam City Archives, Joseph had three younger brothers and four younger sisters: Abraham Penso Felix (ca 1656-1710) was a schoolmaster, a diamond seller and traded in slaves; David (1654-) and Raphael Penso (ca 1659-) were merchants, who moved to London; Jochebet Pensa (1655-1718), Ribca Penso (1662-1720), Abigail Penso (ca 1663-1708) and Lea Pensa (1664-1710) lived in Amsterdam.

Joseph was taught by Isaac Aboab da Fonseca and Moses Raphael de Aguilar, members of the Talmud Torah community. He completed his first Hebrew drama, "Asire ha-Tiḳwah" ("The prisoner of hope"), in three acts, which appeared in Amsterdam in 1673 at Joseph Athias  and in which he allegorically depicted the victory of the will over the passions. He married Raquel Alvares Vega from Antwerp, unknown is when. His commercial life began in Amsterdam in 1679 with a bill protest on Portugal; it is the only record on his name.  He filled the honorary offices of president of the Academia de los Sitibundos and in 1685 as secretary of the Academia de los Floridos, founded by Manuel de Belmonte (-1705), a court jew from 1674 resident of the Spanish king (who organized slave trades between 1679 and 1691).

In August 1688 Joseph de la Vega lived through the collapse of the Dutch East India Company and Dutch West India Company, which financially ruined him.  The funding of the armed invasion of William III in England caused a financial crisis in the Dutch Republic.  Consequently, the financiers following William III to Britain possessed a full range of financial techniques, and for which they found a ready market indeed. This transfer of know-how formed the basis of derivatives trading in London, firmly linking Amsterdam's pioneering work to the emergence of modern markets. He was buried at Beth Haim of Ouderkerk aan de Amstel.

Confusion of Confusions (1688) 

Written in Spanish under the title , the volume was printed in Amsterdam and published in Antwerp. Although he did not provide a descriptive account of the process of stock trading, Joseph presented a history of speculation in stocks and ducatons, acquainting the reader with the sophisticated financial instruments used. He employed a dialogue format that enabled the reader to understand the respective perspectives of the various market participants and the intricacies of speculation and trading.

Joseph also came up with four basic principles that remain relevant today:

The first rule in speculation is: Never advise anyone to buy or sell shares. Where guessing correctly is a form of witchcraft, counsel cannot be put on airs.

The second rule: Accept both your profits and regrets. It is best to seize what comes to hand when it comes, and not expect that your good fortune and the favorable circumstances will last.

The third rule: Profit in the share market is goblin treasure: at one moment, it is carbuncles, the next it is coal; one moment diamonds, and the next pebbles. Sometimes, they are the tears that Aurora leaves on the sweet morning's grass, at other times, they are just tears.

The fourth rule: He who wishes to become rich from this game must have both money and patience.

Legacy
Joseph de la Vega, who used his mother′s last name, wrote over 200 letters to different princes and statesmen.  remained little known until 1892, when German economist Richard Ehrenberg published an influential essay in the Jahrbücher für Nationalökonomie und Statistik entitled "Die Amsterdamer Aktienspekulation im 17. Jahrhundert." According to L. Petram, Joseph devoted a disproportionate amount of attention to tricks and schemes; his book is riddled with too much drama and too many technical shortcomings to be useful as an instruction manual. Joseph  wrote Confusión primarily for the entertainment of educated members of the Sephardic community (the Academia de los Floridos).

Since 2000, the  has awarded the annual De La Vega Prize to "young European researchers who distinguish themselves by outstanding research on the securities markets in Europe".

Other works 
Other of his works include:
Discurso académico moral. Hecho en la Insigne Academia de los Sitibundos (Amsterdam, 1683; dedicated to Isaac Senior Texeira in Hamburg).
Triunfos del águila y eclipses de la luna (ib. 1683).
La Rosa, Panegírico Sacro, Hecho en la Insigne Academia de los Sitibundos (ib. 1683).
Rumbos peligrosos por donde navega con título de novelas la zozobrante nave de la temeridad (Antwerp, 1684).
Discursos académicos, morales, retóricos, y sagrados. Recitados en la Florida Academia de los Floridos (ib. 1685).
Retrato de la Prudencia, y simulacro del Valor, al Augusto Monarca Guilielmo Tercero, Rey de la Gran Bretaña (ib. 1690), printed by Joan Bus, using the rare ascendonica italic.
  This collection of short essays includes a section of five essays translated from Italian authors (Giovanni Battista Manzini, Ferrante Pallavicino, Vicenzo Pasqualigo, Antonio Lupis and Giovanni Francesco Loredan), followed by seven more that the author wrote himself.

References

Source
 Jewish Encyclopedia     The article on Penso, Joseph was written by Isidore Singer and Meyer Kayserling
 Valuation Of Equity Securities: History, Theory And Application by Geoffrey Poitras

External links
 Penso de la Vega and the Question of Jewish Baroque by Einat Davidi. In: Religious Changes and Cultural Transformations in the Early Modern Western Sephardic Communities (2019) DOI: https://doi.org/10.1163/9789004392489_020
  FESE prize
 Pricing the Future: Finance, Physics, and the 300-year Journey to the Black ...by George G. Szpiro
 Penso's Roots: The Politics and Poetics of Cultural Fusion by Eleazar Gutwirth. Studia Rosenthaliana, Vol. 35, No. 2 (2001), pp. 269-284. Published by: Peeters Publishers. https://www.jstor.org/stable/41482458

1650 births
1692 deaths
17th-century Sephardi Jews
Dutch Sephardi Jews
Jewish poets
Dutch male poets
Spanish poets
Dutch Jews
Spanish Jews
Dutch people of Spanish-Jewish descent
People from the Province of Córdoba (Spain)
Writers from Amsterdam
Spanish emigrants to the Dutch Republic
17th century in Amsterdam